Gerald Damon Glass (born November 12, 1967) is a retired American professional basketball player.

Graduating from Amanda Elzy High School in Greenwood at the age of sixteen, Glass went to Delta State University. Alcorn State University coach Davey Whitney called Glass the best player in Mississippi.

Glass played for two years at Delta State University and then transferred to the University of Mississippi where he placed fourth in the nation in scoring as a junior. He finished his career, after just two seasons, as the school's sixth leading all-time scorer. Glass was referred to as "World Class Glass" at Ole Miss. He played against LSU's Chris Jackson.

He was selected by the Minnesota Timberwolves with the 20th overall pick in the 1990 NBA Draft. As a rookie, Glass set a Timberwolves franchise record for a reserve with 32 points off the bench versus the Los Angeles Lakers. Glass also played for the Detroit Pistons, New Jersey Nets and Charlotte Hornets in four NBA seasons from 1990–1996. His best season as a pro was in 1991–92 for the Timberwolves, when he appeared in 75 games averaging 11.5 points per game.

In 2004, Gerald Glass was honored by Chick-fil-A as part of their SEC Basketball Legends, along with LSU coach Dale Brown, University of Alabama player Derrick McKey, University of Tennessee sharpshooter Dale Ellis, University of Kentucky player Dan Issel, and Auburn's Charles Barkley.

After a year with Andy Kennedy's coaching staff at Ole Miss, Glass became the head coach at his high school alma mater. He later was the head boys basketball coach at Madison Central High School in Madison, Mississippi for 2 seasons.

See also
List of NCAA Division I men's basketball players with 2000 points and 1000 rebounds

Notes

External links
Career stats
2004 SEC legends

References 

1967 births
Living people
African-American basketball players
American expatriate basketball people in Israel
American men's basketball players
Basketball coaches from Mississippi
Basketball players from Mississippi
Bnei Hertzeliya basketball players
Charlotte Hornets players
Delta State Statesmen basketball players
Detroit Pistons players
Israeli Basketball Premier League players
Minnesota Timberwolves draft picks
Minnesota Timberwolves players
New Jersey Nets players
Ole Miss Rebels men's basketball players
People from Greenwood, Mississippi
Shooting guards
Small forwards
21st-century African-American people
20th-century African-American sportspeople